Pembroke River is a short waterway near Pembroke, Pembrokeshire, West Wales.

Course
Rising at Hogeston Hill, near Manorbier Newton, the river meanders through Lamphey and flows past Pembroke Castle to its confluence with Milford Haven Waterway at Pennar Mouth.

When the river reaches the town of Pembroke, there are three pools, the first of which is Mill Pond, then downstream is Middle Mill Pond, followed by Castle Pond below the castle. The river is navigable to small craft from Pennar to Mill Pond, but is normally closed at Castle Pond. A rally is held once a year to allow small craft into Castle Pond, and since 1994 an annual canoe race has been held in the river.

History
An Elizabethan map of 1578 does not name the river, but does note Pennar Mouth.

In 1804, The Cambrian reproduced text from Campbell' Political Survey of Britain, quoting A dockyard was built soon afterwards, not on the Pembroke River, but on the River Cleddau just to the north, which became Pembroke Dockyard, developing into the town of Pembroke Dock. Writing in 1810, Richard Fenton notes that there is a Pembroke Ferry, although he does not name the river, which may have been across the Cleddau. The River Pembroke, though, was clearly still an important waterway, as Lewis's Topographical Dictionary of 1833 describes: Lewis also refers to the river as "a branch of Milford Harbour (which) terminates at the town". Further, it says:

In February 1889 the river was the scene of a tragedy when the Bentlass ferry boat capsized and sank, drowning all 16 passengers and crew.

References

External links

Pembroke Town Guide 2019 (includes maps of stretches of the river)
Pembroke and Monkton Local History Society

Rivers of Pembrokeshire